The Alma-class ironclads were a group of seven wooden-hulled, armored corvettes built for the French Navy in the mid to late 1860s. Three of the ships attempted to blockade Prussian ports in the Baltic Sea in 1870 during the Franco-Prussian War. Three others patrolled the North Sea and the Atlantic, while the last ship was en route to Japan when the war began and blockaded two small Prussian ships in a Japanese harbor. Afterwards they alternated periods of reserve and active commissions, many of them abroad. Three of the ships participated in the French occupation of Tunisia in 1881 while another helped to intimidate the Vietnamese Government into accepting status as a French protectorate and played a small role in the Sino-French War of 1884–85.

Design and description
The Alma-class ironclads were designed by Henri Dupuy de Lôme as improved versions of the armored corvette  suitable for foreign deployments. Unlike their predecessor the ships were true central battery ironclads as they were fitted with armored transverse bulkheads. The original plan for these ships was to have a two-deck battery with four  guns on the battery deck and four  guns mounted above them on the upper deck, one gun at each corner of the battery. This design was changed to substitute four barbettes for the upper battery, but the addition of armored bulkheads proved to be very heavy and the rear pair of barbettes had to be deleted to save weight. In partial compensation the 164-millimeter guns in the remaining forward barbettes were replaced by an additional pair of 194-millimeter guns. Like most ironclads of their era they were equipped with a metal-reinforced ram.

The ships were built from the same general plan, but differed amongst themselves. Their crew numbered 316 officers and men.

Propulsion
The Alma-class ships had a single horizontal return connecting-rod steam engine driving a single propeller. Their engine was powered by four oval boilers. Unlike the single funnels of the others,  and  had two funnels, mounted side by side.

Armament
The ships mounted four of their 194-millimeter Modèle 1864 breech-loading guns in the central battery on the battery deck. The other two 194-millimeter guns were mounted in barbettes on the upper deck, sponsoned out over the sides of the ship. The four  guns were also mounted on the upper deck.  is the only ship positively known to have exchanged her 194 mm guns for newer Modèle 1870 guns. The guns could fire both solid shot and explosive shells.

Armor
The unarmored portions of their sides were protected by  iron plates.

Ships

Service
During the Franco-Prussian War of 1870–71 Thétis, Jeanne d'Arc and Armide were assigned to the Northern Squadron that attempted to blockade Prussian ports on the Baltic until ordered to return to Cherbourg on 16 September 1870. Montcalm, Atalante, and Reine Blanche cruised the North Sea and Montcalm later watched a Prussian corvette in Portuguese waters. Alma was en route to the Far East when the war began and she blockaded a pair of Prussian corvettes in Yokohama harbor once she arrived at Japan.

After the end of the war many of the ships were placed in reserve or sent to foreign stations, often as the flagship. During the Third Carlist War of 1872–76 Thétis, Reine Blanche and Jeanne d'Arc spent time in Spanish waters where they could protect French citizens and interests. In 1875, the latter ship rammed and sank the dispatch vessel Forfait. On 3 July 1877 Thétis rammed Reine Blanche who had to be run ashore to prevent her from sinking.

Further abroad Reine Blanche and Alma bombarded the Tunisian port of Sfax in July 1881 as part of the French occupation of Tunisia. Atalante participated in the Battle of Thuận An in August 1883. This was an attack by the French on the forts defending the mouth of the Perfume River, leading to the Vietnamese capital of Huế in an attempt to intimidate the Vietnamese government. During the Sino-French War of 1884–85 the ship was in Huế in early September 1884, but she carried Admiral Amédée Courbet to Keelung, Taiwan on 23 September.

Notes

Footnotes

References
 

 
 

Ships built in France
 
Corvettes of France
Ship classes of the French Navy